The Globe Theatre (est.1871) was a playhouse in Boston, Massachusetts, in the 19th century. It was located at 598 Washington Street, near the corner of Essex Street. Arthur Cheney oversaw the Globe until 1876. From 1871-1873 it occupied the former theatre of John H. Selwyn. After a fire in May 1873, the Globe re-opened on the same site in December 1874. Architect Benjamin F. Dwight designed the new building. From 1877-1893 John Stetson served as proprietor; some regarded him as "a theatrical producer with a reputation for illiteracy in his day such as Samuel Goldwyn has achieved" in the 1960s. The theatre burned down in January 1894.

Horatio J. Homer, Boston's first African-American police officer, worked as a janitor at the Globe Theatre before being hired by the Boston Police Department.

Performances

1870s
 H.A. Rendle's Chesney Wold, with Madame Janauschek
 Fox's Humpty Dumpty
 Augustin Daly's Pique, with Miss Jeffries-Lewis
 E.A. Sothern as Lord Dundreary
 "Sea of Ice" with Miss Maud Granger as Ocarita and Mr. George Boniface as Carlos, Monday, January 28, 1878 
 Eliza Weathersby's Froliques
The Scouts of the Prairie, with Buffalo Bill Cody, Texas Jack Omohundro, Ned Buntline, and Giuseppina Morlacchi, week of March 5, 1873.
 Miss Kate Claxton in Two Orphans

1880s
 "Rice's new extravaganza combination in the opera comique Calino"
 Othello, starring Salvini
 L.R. Shewell's Debt of Honor
 Oscar Wilde lecture June 2, 1882
 Oedipus
 14 Days, with Charles Wyndham
 We, Us & Co., with Mestayer-Vaughn
 Gilbert & Sullivan's Mikado, with Helen Lamont and Signor Brocolini
 As in a Looking-Glass, with Mrs. Langtry
 The Hanlons in "Fantasma"
 Princess Ida
 Ibsen's A Doll's House, with Beatrice Cameron
 The Oolah (1889)

1890s
 The Lion Tamer, with Francis Wilson
 Ali Baba, with American Extravaganza Co.
 The Crust of Society
 Prince Karl, with Richard Mansfield
 Hanlon Brothers' "mechanical fairy spectacle Superba"
 La Cigale, with Lillian Russell

References

External links

 NYPL. Globe Theatre Company, Boston (fl. 1870)
 Boston Athenæum Theater History , Globe Theatre, Boston

Cultural history of Boston
19th century in Boston
Boston Theater District
1871 establishments in Massachusetts
Former theatres in Boston
Event venues established in 1871
Theatres completed in 1874
Burned buildings and structures in the United States